Henry Robins (by 1515 – 1562 or later), of Caernarvon, was a Welsh politician.

He was a Member (MP) of the Parliament of England for Caernarvon Boroughs in October 1553 and April 1554.

References

Year of death missing
16th-century Welsh politicians
People from Caernarfon
Members of Parliament for Caernarfon
English MPs 1553 (Mary I)
English MPs 1554
Year of birth uncertain